Villery is a commune in the Aube department in north-central France.

Population

See also 
Communes of the Aube department

References 

Communes of Aube
Aube communes articles needing translation from French Wikipedia